Mušutište is a village in the Suva Reka municipality in Kosovo. It is located to the west of the Nerodimka mountain. It has 10 medieval Serbian Orthodox churches, including the notable Church of Virgin Hodegetria, which was destroyed in 1999.

The village used to have a mixed Albanian-Serbian population; according to the 1991 census, it had 5016 inhabitants.

The Serbian inhabitants fled the village during the Kosovo war. All their houses were subsequently set on fire and most of their properties usurped. Their return to the village is actively boycotted by an Albanian far-right movement, in an atmosphere dominated by incitement to hatred and frequent slander. To date, not a single Serbian family has been able to resettle in the village.

History
It was first mentioned in a Serbian charter dating to 1315. In a charter of Emperor Stephen Uroš IV Dušan, dating to 1348, Mušutište, along with the churches of Virgin Hodegetria and St. Symeon (Sv. Simeona), were granted (metochion) to the Saint Archangels Monastery in Prizren.

The mass abduction in Mušutište was a war crime against the Serb civilian population in Mušutište. The abduction occurred on 12 June 1999, when Albanian soldiers attacked Mušutište and kidnapped 18 Serb civilians. According to Human Rights Watch, among the victims were twelve men, five women and one five-year-old girl.

Notes

References

Villages in Suva Reka